The 1st constituency of the Loir-et-Cher is a French legislative constituency in the department of Loir-et-Cher.

Deputies

Election results

2022

2017

2012

References

Sources

 
 

1